The Bureau of Industry Economics (1978-1998) was an Australian government body dedicated to advising the government on industry matters, particularly pertaining to investment. In 1998 with the passing of the Productivity Commission Act 1998 the bureau was merged with the Industry Commission, and the Economic Planning Advisory Commission to create the Productivity Commission.

In 1992 the Bureau published a report later used by the Howard government detailing potential cuts in the public service. One notable cut was the National Space Program.

References 

Industry in Australia
Commonwealth Government agencies of Australia
1978 establishments in Australia
Government agencies established in 1978
Productivity organizations
Defunct Commonwealth Government agencies of Australia
1998 disestablishments in Australia